Ad text optimization (ATO) is the process of improving the performance of a text Pay Per Click (PPC) Advertisement on search engines by improving its Click Through Rate (CTR) performance both in terms of volume and quality of response, that is “more buyers, less browsers”.  ATO is an element of Search engine optimization, where the subject is discussed in greater detail.

According to Search Engine Journal, “AdWords text ads are small and in some ways unassuming – when you think about testing landing pages it’s obvious that there are elements that could make a big impact, but it’s sometimes less intuitive that ad text tests can and often do have an equally big impact on results.”

Work method
PPC Ads are triggered to appear on search engine pages when Users search with keywords which match those selected by the PPC Advertiser. When PPC Ads are clicked on they take the User through to a designated page on the advertiser’s website and a fee is paid to the search engine for the click.  At the heart of Ad Text Optimization (ATO) lies a specialist type of direct response copywriting which can be augmented by an Ad Text Optimization (ATO) algorithm that measures the response effectiveness of Ad Text copy. For Users the benefit of ATO is to make PPC Ads more relevant to their searches. For advertisers ATO is delivers more clicks, leading to more sales and increased return on investment (ROI), and search engines benefit by offering their user customers more efficient search experiences.

ATO and Quality Score
Many search engines, Google being the most notable example, reward more efficient PPC ads with higher Quality Scores, which are measured by higher CTRs.  The higher the Quality Score of a PPC ad the lower the bid price the advertiser has to pay each time a User clicks on the relevant Keywords that triggers the PPC ad appearing.  Higher Quality Scores combined with your CPC bid equals high Ad Rank (Ad Rank = CPC Bid * Quality Score), which result in PPC ads appearing higher up in the Users search results.  ATO can play a key role in increasing a PPC ad’s Quality Score, and Google publishes its overview of ATO on its elearning centre, saying that  “ad text plays a crucial role in determining the success of your AdWords advertising.”

ATO and SEO
ATO in PPC advertising is viewed by many in marketing as the equivalent of SEO (Search Engine Optimization) for natural search in that they both improve the visibility of websites.

ATO and Advertising
Recently in the UK, PPC Ads have come under the scrutiny of the Advertising Standards Authority (ASA).  This has been commentated on by many in the marketing and advertising fraternity as evidence that PPC Ads now constitute an established part of the marketing mix.  According to the UK’s Internet Advertising Bureau (IAB), search is now a significant advertising medium in its own right with the paid search market worth almost £2.15 billion in 2009 representing 60.7% of online advertising spend in the UK.  PPC Ads make up the lion’s share of this market and some argue that its future growth will in part be fuelled by ATO becoming an ever more integral part of the writing of PPC Ads.

References

Compensation methods
Pricing
Online advertising methods